David Rundblad (born October 8, 1990) is a Swedish professional ice hockey player who is currently playing with Kärpät in the Liiga. Rundblad was drafted 17th overall by the St. Louis Blues in the 2009 NHL Entry Draft. He began his NHL career with the Ottawa Senators before being traded to the Phoenix Coyotes. On March 4, 2014, he was traded to the Chicago Blackhawks. He won the Stanley Cup with the Blackhawks in 2015.

Playing career

Professional
Rundblad scored his first Elitserien goal on March 14, 2009, in a playoff game against Linköpings HC. NHL Central Scouting ranked Rundblad sixth among European skaters for the 2009 NHL Entry Draft, one spot behind Skellefteå AIK teammate Tim Erixon. The following season, Rundblad remained with Skellefteå and scored his first regular season goal on January 30, 2010 against Mattias Modig of Luleå HF, a goal that ended up being the game-winner.

On June 10, 2010, it was announced that Rundblad had signed an entry-level contract with St. Louis. On June 25, 2010, he was acquired by the Ottawa Senators in exchange for the 16th overall pick in 2010, which the Blues used to select Vladimir Tarasenko.

Rundblad finished the 2010–11 season with 50 points in 55 games, the second highest point total of any defenceman in Elitserien history, after David Petrasek, who had 53 points (in 52 games) in 2009–10.

Rundblad attended his first Senators camp in 2011, and remained on the roster into the season. Rundblad made his NHL debut on October 11, 2011, against the Minnesota Wild. Rundblad's first NHL point was an assist on a goal by Peter Regin on October 15 in a game against the Washington Capitals. His first NHL goal came on November 27, 2011, against Cam Ward of the Carolina Hurricanes.

On December 17, 2011, Rundblad was traded to the Phoenix Coyotes (along with a second-round draft pick) for forward Kyle Turris. Rundblad participated in the AHL All-Star Classic in Providence, Rhode Island, on January 28, 2013. He scored six goals and had 17 assists for 23 points in 32 games before the break. On March 4, 2014, Rundblad (along with defenceman Mathieu Brisebois) was traded to the Chicago Blackhawks in exchange for a second-round pick in 2014.

In 2015, Rundblad won the Stanley Cup with the Chicago Blackhawks, having played in 49 Regular Season games and five Playoff games, including two games in the Stanley Cup Final.

In the 2015–16 season, Rundblad made the Blackhawks opening night roster primarily as the team's reserve defenseman. He provided two assists in nine games before he was placed on waivers and later reassigned to the Rockford IceHogs. Before playing with Rockford, on January 3, 2016, it was announced that Rundblad was loaned to the ZSC Lions of Switzerland's National League A for the remainder of the season. He later returned to the Blackhawks for their post-season run, appearing in three games.

On 1 July 2016, Rundblad became a free agent after he was placed on waivers and bought-out from the remaining year of his contract with the Blackhawks. He signed to return to the ZSC Lions of the Swiss top-flight National League A on September 2, 2016. After finishing his ZSC stint, he made the jump to the KHL, signing with SKA Saint Petersburg on May 10, 2017.

On 23 June 2022, Rundblad left the KHL following three seasons with Sochi and moved to the Finnish Liiga on a one-year contract with Kärpät.

International play

Rundblad represented Sweden at the 2009 World Junior Championships and 2010 World Junior Championships. During the 2010 tournament, Rundblad was an alternate captain for the Swedish team.

Career statistics

Regular season and playoffs

International

References

External links

1990 births
Living people
Chicago Blackhawks players
National Hockey League first-round draft picks
Ottawa Senators players
People from Lycksele Municipality
Phoenix Coyotes players
Portland Pirates players
Rockford IceHogs (AHL) players
St. Louis Blues draft picks
SKA Saint Petersburg players
Skellefteå AIK players
HC Sochi players
Swedish ice hockey defencemen
Stanley Cup champions
ZSC Lions players
Sportspeople from Västerbotten County